La Celle-Saint-Cloud is a commune in the Yvelines department of the Île-de-France region in north-central France. In 2019, it had a population of 20,692.

Demographics

Transport
La Celle-Saint-Cloud is served by two stations on the Transilien Paris-Saint-Lazare suburban rail line: La Celle-Saint-Cloud and Bougival.

Main sights
 The Château de la Celle, now property of the Ministry of Europe and Foreign Affairs
 The Château de Beauregard (only a fragment remains) 
 The Pavillon du Butard

Education
Public preschool and elementary schools in the commune:
 Groupe scolaire Jules Ferry
Groupe scolaire Henri Dunant
Groupe Scolaire Louis Pasteur
Groupe Scolaire Morel de Vindé
Groupe Scolaire Pierre et Marie Curie

Junior high schools:
 Collège Victor Hugo
 Collège Louis Pasteur

Senior high schools:
 Lycée Pierre Corneille
 Lycée Professionnel Lucien-René Duchesne
 Lycée Professionnel Jean-Baptiste Colbert

Private primary schools:
 École privée Sainte-Marie

Notable people
La Celle-Saint-Cloud is the birthplace of the noted Franco-British author Hilaire Belloc. It was also the home of English actress Harriet Howard following her affair with Napoleon III. She owned the château de Beauregard, which was later owned by Maurice de Hirsch.

Lucien-Rene Duchesne (1908–1984), mayor of La Celle-Saint-Cloud from 1959 to 1981.

French actress and model Ludivine Sagnier (of Mesrine: Part 2 fame) is also a native of La Celle-Saint-Cloud.

Since September 2014, politician Marine Le Pen has resided in the town.

See also
Communes of the Yvelines department

References

External links
Official website (in French)

Communes of Yvelines